Abdul Ali Mridha was a Bangladeshi politician. He was elected as MP of Narsingdi-5 constituency in 5th and 6th general election of Bangladesh. He died on 9 March 2019.

References

Bangladesh Nationalist Party politicians
People from Narsingdi District
5th Jatiya Sangsad members
6th Jatiya Sangsad members
2019 deaths
Bengali politicians
People of the Bangladesh Liberation War
Year of birth missing